James Dickinson may refer to:

 James Shelton Dickinson (1818–1882), Confederate States of America politician
 James Dickinson (cricketer) (born 1998), Scottish cricketer
 James Charles (James Charles Dickinson, born 1999), American internet celebrity and model
 James H. Dickinson, United States Army general
 James Dickinson (taxidermist) (born 1950), English taxidermist
 Jimmy Dickinson (1925–1982), English footballer
 Jimmy Dickinson (footballer, born 1899) (1899–1971), English footballer
 Jim Dickinson (1941–2009), American record producer, pianist, and singer